Ponirak is a village in the City of Zenica, Bosnia and Herzegovina. It is located on the southern banks of the River Bosna.

Demographics 
According to the 2013 census, its population was 374.

References

Populated places in Zenica